Lubbock
is the 10th-most populous city in the U.S. state of Texas and the seat of government of Lubbock County. With a population of 260,993 in 2021, the city is also the 85th-most populous in the United States. The city is in the northwestern part of the state, a region known historically and geographically as the Llano Estacado, and ecologically is part of the southern end of the High Plains, lying at the economic center of the Lubbock metropolitan area, which had an estimated population of 325,245 in 2021.

Lubbock's nickname, "Hub City," derives from it being the economic, educational, and health-care hub of the multicounty region, north of the Permian Basin and south of the Texas Panhandle, commonly called the South Plains. The area is the largest contiguous cotton-growing region in the world and is heavily dependent on water from the Ogallala Aquifer for irrigation.

Lubbock is home to Texas Tech University, the sixth-largest college by enrollment in the state.

History

In 1867, the land that would become Lubbock was the heart of Comancheria, the shifting domain controlled by the Comanche. 

Lubbock County was founded in 1876. It was named after Thomas Saltus Lubbock, former Texas Ranger and brother of Francis Lubbock, governor of Texas during the Civil War. As early as 1884, a U.S. post office existed in Yellow House Canyon. A small town, known as Old Lubbock, Lubbock, or North Town, was established about three miles to the east. In 1890, the original Lubbock merged with Monterey, another small town south of the canyon. The new town adopted the Lubbock name. The merger included moving the original Lubbock's Nicolett Hotel across the canyon on rollers to the new townsite. Lubbock became the county seat in 1891, and was incorporated on March 16, 1909. In the same year, the first railroad train arrived.

Texas Technological College (now Texas Tech University) was founded in Lubbock in 1923. A separate university, Texas Tech University Health Sciences Center, opened as Texas Tech University School of Medicine in 1969. Both universities are now overseen by the Texas Tech University System, after it was established in 1996 and based in Lubbock. Lubbock Christian University, founded in 1957, and Sunset International Bible Institute, both affiliated with the Churches of Christ, have their main campuses in the city. South Plains College and Wayland Baptist University operate branch campuses in Lubbock.

It was established in August 1941, during the defense build-up prior to World War II (1941–1945), by the United States Department of War and the U.S. Army as Lubbock Army Airfield. It served the old U.S. Army Air Forces, and later the U.S. Air Force (USAF), after reorganization and establishment in 1947. The USAF base's primary mission throughout its existence was pilot training. The base was closed 30 September 1997, after being selected for closure by the Base Realignment and Closure Commission in 1995, and is now a research and business park called Reese Technology Center.

The city is home to the Lubbock Lake Landmark, part of the Museum of Texas Tech University. The landmark is an archaeological and natural-history preserve at the northern edge of the city. It shows evidence of almost 12,000 years of human occupation in the region. The National Ranching Heritage Center, also part of the Museum of Texas Tech University, houses historic ranch-related structures from the region.

During World War II, airmen cadets from the Royal Air Force, flying from their training base at Terrell, Texas, routinely flew to Lubbock on training flights. The town served as a stand-in for the British for Cork, Ireland, which was the same distance from London, England, as Lubbock is from Terrell.

In August 1951, a V-shaped formation of lights was seen over the city. The "Lubbock Lights" series of sightings received national publicity and is regarded as one of the first great "UFO" cases. The sightings were considered credible because they were witnessed by several respected science professors at Texas Technological College and were photographed by a Texas Tech student. The photographs were reprinted nationwide in newspapers and in Life. Project Blue Book, the USAF's official investigation of the UFO mystery, concluded the photographs were not a hoax and showed genuine objects, but dismissed the UFOs as being either "night-flying moths" or a type of bird called a plover reflected in the nighttime glow of Lubbock's new street lights.

On May 11, 1970, the Lubbock Tornado struck the city. Twenty-six people died, and damage was estimated at $125 million. Then-mayor Jim Granberry and the Lubbock City Council, which included Granberry's successor as mayor, Morris W. Turner, were charged with directing the rebuilding of downtown Lubbock in the aftermath of the storm.

In August, 1988, tens of thousands of people came to Lubbock, drawn by an apparition of Mary.

In 2009, Lubbock celebrated its centennial. The historians Paul H. Carlson, Donald R. Abbe, and David J. Murrah co-authored Lubbock and the South Plains.

On August 12, 2008, the Lubbock Chamber of Commerce announced they would lead the effort to get enough signatures to have a vote on allowing county-wide packaged alcohol sales. The petition effort was successful and the question was put to the voters. On May 9, 2009, Proposition 1, which expanded the sale of packaged alcohol in Lubbock County, passed by a margin of nearly two to one, with 64.5% in favor. Proposition 2, which legalized the sale of mixed drinks in restaurants county-wide, passed with 69.5% in favor. On September 23, 2009, The Texas Alcoholic Beverage Commission issued permits to more than 80 stores in Lubbock. Prior to May 9, 2009, Lubbock County allowed "package" sales of alcohol (sales of bottled liquor from liquor stores), but not "by the drink" sales, except at private establishments such as country clubs. Inside the city limits, the situation was reversed, with restaurants and bars able to serve alcohol, but liquor stores forbidden.

After news broke about Planned Parenthood of Greater Texas hiring for a Lubbock location, Senator Charles Perry started a petition to keep Planned Parenthood out of Lubbock. On September 9, 2020 Senator Perry held a press conference with Representative Dustin Burrows and Representative John Frullo in support of Lubbock becoming a "sanctuary city for the unborn" through the passage of an ordinance, written by anti-abortion activist Mark Lee Dickson, which would outlaw abortion within the city limits. On November 17, 2020, the Lubbock City Council voted 7-0 against the ordinance outlawing abortion, leading the "sanctuary city for the unborn" initiating committee to file for the ordinance to be placed on the May ballot.  Planned Parenthood began performing abortions on April 15, 2021 with early voting taking place on April 19, 2021. On May 1st, 2021 the citizens of Lubbock voted on the ordinance with 62% in favor and 38% against, becoming the largest "sanctuary city for the unborn" in the nation. Planned Parenthood filed a lawsuit in an attempt to stop the ordinance from going into effect, but lost their case after the ordinance went into effect on June 1, 2021 and a federal judge dismissed the case. Planned Parenthood later appealed the decision to the 5th Circuit Court of Appeals, but in January 2022 withdrew their appeal.

Geography
Lubbock is considered to be the center of the Llano Estacado portion of the South Plains, with Midland on the southern edge, and Amarillo denoting the northern boundary. The population density was 1,900 people per square mile (740/km2).

Skyline

The tallest buildings in Lubbock are listed below.

Climate
Lubbock has a cool semi-arid climate Köppen classification BSk).

In 2013, Lubbock was named the "Toughest Weather City" in America according to the Weather Channel.

Summers are hot, with 92 afternoons on average of + highs and 13.3 afternoons of + highs, with lows of + on 30 mornings.

Winter afternoons in Lubbock are typically sunny and mild, but mornings are cold, with temperatures usually dipping below freezing, and as the city is in USDA Plant Hardiness Zone 7, lows reaching  occur on 1.5 mornings and 4.5 afternoons occur where the temperature fails to rise above freezing.

Lubbock can experience severe thunderstorms during the spring, and occasionally the summer. The risk of tornadoes and very large hail exists during the spring in particular, as Lubbock sits on the far southwestern edge of Tornado Alley.

Demographics

The 2019 American Community Survey's demographic and housing estimates program determined Lubbock had a population of 258,870, a slight increase over the U.S. Census Bureau's population estimate of 258,862. At the 2010 United States census, 229,573 people, 88,506 households, and 53,042 families resided in the city. At the 2000 U.S. census, 199,564 people, 77,527 households, and 48,531 families resided in the city. By 2020, its population grew to 257,141, down from the 2019 census estimates.

Of the population in 2019, 125,685 were male and 133,185 were female. There were 94.4 males per 100 females in the city limits. In 2019, the median age was 29.8 years; according to Move.org in 2016, Lubbock and its metropolitan area was the 6th best for residents aged 20 and older. The Lubbock area was also first in Texas for Millennial home-ownership, and 14th in the U.S. in 2020. The median value of owner-occupied housing units were $152,800 and the gross rent for Lubbock was $976. Lubbockites had a median household income of $52,254 in 2019, and a mean income of $72,144.

In 2011, the estimated median income for a household in the city was $43,364, and for a family was $59,185. Male full-time workers had a median income of $40,445 versus $30,845 for females. The per capita income for the city was $23,092. About 11.4% of families and 20.8% of the population were below the poverty line, including 24.5% of those under age 18 and 7.3% of those age 65 or over. The city's median household income in 2000 was $31,844, and for the median family income was $41,418. Males had a median income of $30,222 versus $21,708 for females. The city's per capita income was $17,511. About 12.0% of families and 18.4% of the population were below the poverty line, including 21.9% of those under age 18 and 10.1% of those age 65 or over.

Race and ethnicity 

In 2019, Lubbock had a racial and ethnic makeup of 50.1% non-Hispanic whites, 7.1% Blacks and African Americans, 0.3% American Indians and Alaska Natives, 2.6% Asians, <0.1% Native Hawaiian or other Pacific Islander, 0.1% some other race, and 2.4% two or more races. The Hispanic and Latino American population (of any race) was an estimated 37.4% of the total population. For comparison and contrast in 2020, the racial and ethnic makeup of the city was 47.58% non-Hispanic white, 9.57% Black or African American, 0.48% Native American or Alaska Native, 3.59% Asian alone, 0.06% Pacific Islander, 0.32% some other race, 2.81% multiracial, and 35.6% Hispanic or Latino American of any race. The diversifying population reflected state- and nationwide trends among traditional minority populations.

In 2010, the racial makeup of the city was 75.8% White, 8.6% Black or African American, 0.7% Native American, 2.4% Asian, 0.1% Pacific Islander, 9.9% from other races, and 2.5% from two or more races. Hispanics or Latin Americans of any race were 32.1% of the population. Non-Hispanic whites were 55.7% of the population in 2010, down from 77.2% in 1970. In 2000, the city's racial makeup was 72.9% White, 8.7% African American, 0.6% Native American, 1.5% Asian, <0.1% Pacific Islander, 14.3% from other races, and 2.0% from two or more races. Hispanics or Latinos of any race were 27.5% of the population.

Religion 
Christianity is the dominant religion in Lubbock and its metropolitan area, being part of the Bible Belt. As of 2020, the largest Christian groups were Baptists, followed by the Catholic Church and Methodism. The largest Baptist denominations within the Lubbock area are the Southern Baptist Convention and Baptist General Convention of Texas. Catholics within the metropolitan area are primarily served by the Roman Catholic Diocese of Lubbock. Methodists are divided between the United Methodist Church and other smaller Methodist bodies. Of the religious population, 1.9% practiced Islam; the Islamic religion is the second largest in the area as of 2020. Eastern faiths including Buddhism and Hinduism were collectively the third largest groups in Lubbock, and Judaism was practiced by an estimated 0.1% of the population.

Economy
The Lubbock area is the largest contiguous cotton-growing region in the world and is heavily dependent on federal government agricultural subsidies and on irrigation water drawn from the Ogallala Aquifer. The aquifer is being depleted at a rate unsustainable over the long term. Much progress has been made toward water conservation, and new technologies such as low-energy precision application irrigation were originally developed in the Lubbock area.

Adolph R. Hanslik, who died in 2007 at the age of 90, was called the "dean" of the Lubbock cotton industry, having worked for years to promote the export trade. Hanslik was also the largest contributor (through 2006) to the Texas Tech University Medical Center. He also endowed the Texas Czech Heritage and Cultural Center's capital campaign for construction of a new library museum archives building in La Grange in Fayette County in his native southeastern Texas.

The 10 largest employers in terms of the number of employees are Texas Tech University, Covenant Health System, Lubbock Independent School District, University Medical Center, United Supermarkets, City of Lubbock, Texas Tech University Health Sciences Center, AT&T, and Lubbock County. A study conducted by a professor at the Rawls College of Business determined Texas Tech students, faculty, and staff contribute about $1.5 billion to the economy, with about $297.5 million from student shopping alone.

Environmental issues
The Scrub-A-Dubb Barrel Company, in the north of the city, had been the cause of public complaints, and committed numerous environmental violations, since the 1970s. Local KCBD News undertook several investigations into the barrel recycling company's waste-handling practices, and when the business closed in 2011, the Environmental Protection Agency was called in to begin cleaning up the site, which they described as "a threat to public health, welfare, and the environment". Greg Fife, the EPA's on-site coordinator, said: "Out of the 60,000 [barrels] we have on site, we think there are between 2,000 and 4,000 that have significant hazardous waste in them". Local residents were informed, "hazardous substances have overflowed the vats and flowed off the site into nearby Blackwater Draw and subsequently through Mackenzie recreational park. The runoff is easily accessible to children at play in the park, golfers, and the park's wildlife." Remediation of the site was expected to take at least five months, at a cost of $3.5 million in federal dollars.

Arts and culture

Annual cultural events

Every year on July 4, Lubbock hosts the 4th on Broadway event, an Independence Day festival. The event is free to the public, and is considered the largest free festival in Texas. The day's activities usually include a morning parade, a street fair along Broadway Avenue with food stalls and live bands, the Early Settlers' Luncheon, and an evening concert/fireworks program. Broadway Festivals Inc., the nonprofit corporation which organizes the event, estimated a 2004 attendance over 175,000 people. Additionally, the College Baseball Foundation holds events relating to its National College Baseball Hall of Fame during the 4th on Broadway event.

The South Plains Fair is also hosted annually, and features a wide variety of entertainment, including live music, theme-park rides, and various food items sold in a carnival-like setting. During the fair, many agricultural and livestock contests also take place, bringing many participants from the surrounding cities.

The National Cowboy Symposium and Celebration, an annual event celebrating the prototypical Old West cowboy, takes place in Lubbock. The event, held in September, features art, music, cowboy poetry, stories, and the presentation of scholarly papers on cowboy culture and the history of the American West. A chuckwagon cook-off and horse parade also take place during the event.

Music

The West Texas arts scene has created a "West Texas Walk of Fame" within Buddy and Maria Elena Holly Plaza in the historic Depot District, which details musicians such as Buddy Holly, who came from the local area. Lubbock continues to play host to rising and established alt-country acts at venues such as the Cactus Theater and The Blue Light Live, both on Buddy Holly Avenue. The spirit of Buddy Holly is preserved in the Buddy Holly Center in Lubbock's Depot District. The 2004 film Lubbock Lights showcased much of the music associated with the city of Lubbock.

Lubbock is the birthplace of rock and roll legend Buddy Holly, and features a cultural center named for him. The city renamed its annual Buddy Holly Music Festival the Lubbock Music Festival after Holly's widow increased usage fees for his name. Similarly, the city renamed the Buddy Holly West Texas Walk of Fame to honor area musicians as the West Texas Hall of Fame. On January 26, 2009, the City of Lubbock agreed to pay Holly's widow $20,000 for the next 20 years to maintain the name of the Buddy Holly Center. Additionally, land near the center will be named the Buddy and Maria Holly Plaza. Holly's legacy is also remembered through the work of deejays, such as Jerry "Bo" Coleman, Bud Andrews, and Virgil Johnson on radio station KDAV.

Groundbreaking was held on April 20, 2017, for the construction of a new performing arts center, the Buddy Holly Hall of Performing Arts and Sciences, a downtown $154 million project that opened in January 2021. Holly Hall will also have concession sites and a bistro with both outdoor and indoor dining. United Supermarkets has been named the food and beverage provider. Thus far, the private group, the Lubbock Entertainment and Performing Arts Association, has raised or received pledges in the amount of $93 million. The Lubbock Independent School District and Ballet Lubbock also support the project.

Lubbock is the birthplace of Mac Davis (1942–2020), who graduated at the age of 16 from Lubbock High School and became a country music singer, songwriter, and actor with crossover success. His early work writing for Elvis Presley produced the hits "Memories", "In the Ghetto", and "A Little Less Conversation". A subsequent solo career in the 1970s produced hits, such as "Baby, Don't Get Hooked on Me", making him a well-known name in popular music. He also starred in his own variety show, a Broadway musical, and various films and television programs.

Outsider musician and psychobilly pioneer The Legendary Stardust Cowboy was also born in Lubbock.  He began his musical career there, playing free shows in various parking lots around town.  Since striking it big, however, he has not performed in Lubbock, due to how little support and encouragement the city showed him when he was first starting out. John Denver got his start in Lubbock and as a freshman student at Texas Tech in 1966 could be found playing in the Student Union for free. His father was a colonel in the USAF stationed at Reese Air Force Base west of the city.

The Lubbock Symphony Orchestra was founded in 1946 and performs at the Lubbock Memorial Civic Center Theatre.

The Moonlight Musicals Amphitheater is a 930-seat amphitheater opened in 2006. For a period was known as the Wells Fargo Amphitheater. It is used for concerts, stage shows and other special events.

Tourism

Lubbock's Memorial Civic Center hosts many events. Former Mayor Morris Turner (1931–2008), who served from 1972 to 1974, has been called the father of the Civic Center. Other past mayors include Jim Granberry and Roy Bass.

According to a study released by the nonpartisan Bay Area Center for Voting Research in 2005, Lubbock is the second-most conservative city in the United States among municipalities greater than 100,000 in population.

Lubbock sits within the Texas High Plains, an eight-million-acre region that produces 80% of the state's wine grapes. Five wineries, including the most award-winning in Texas (Llano Estacado Winery), are based near Lubbock, providing a significant draw for wine lovers.

The National Ranching Heritage Center, a museum of ranching history, is in Lubbock. It features a number of authentic early Texas ranch buildings, as well as a railroad depot and other historic buildings. An extensive collection of weapons is also on display. Jim Humphreys, late manager of the Pitchfork Ranch east of Lubbock, was a prominent board member of the center. The American Cowboy Culture Association, founded in 1989, is in Lubbock; it co-hosts the annual National Cowboy Symposium and Celebration held annually from Thursday through Sunday after Labor Day.

The Southwest Collection, an archive of the history of the region and its surroundings, which also works closely with the College Baseball Foundation, is on the campus of Texas Tech University, as are the Moody Planetarium and the Museum of Texas Tech University.

The Depot District, an area of the city dedicated to music and nightlife in the old railroad depot area, boasts theatres, upscale restaurants, and cultural attractions. The district is also home to several shops, pubs, nightclubs, a radio station, a magazine, a winery, a salon, and other establishments. Many of the buildings were remodeled from the original Fort Worth & Denver South Plains Railway Depot which stood on the site. The Buddy Holly Center, a museum highlighting the life and music of Buddy Holly, is also in the Depot District, as is the restored community facility, the Cactus Theater.

Lubbock is also home to the Silent Wings Museum. Located on North I-27, Silent Wings features photographs and artifacts from World War II-era glider pilots.

The Science Spectrum is an interactive museum and 58-foot, domed-screen "omni theatre" with a special focus on children and youth.

National Register of Historic Places

Cactus Theater
Canyon Lakes Archaeological District
Carlock Building
Fort Worth and Denver South Plains Railway Depot
Fred and Annie Snyder House
Holden Properties Historic District
Kress Building
Lubbock High School
Lubbock Lake Landmark
Lubbock Post Office and Federal Building
South Overton Residential Historic District
Texas Technological College Dairy Barn
Texas Technological College Historic District
Tubbs-Carlisle House
Warren and Myrta Bacon House
William Curry Holden and Olive Price Holden House

Sports

The Texas Tech Red Raiders are in the Big 12 Conference and field 17 teams in 11 different varsity sports. Men's varsity sports at Texas Tech are baseball, basketball, cross country, football, golf, tennis, and indoor and outdoor track and field. Women's varsity sports are basketball, cross country, golf, indoor and outdoor track and field, soccer, softball, tennis, and volleyball. The university also offers 30 club sports, including cycling, equestrianism, ice hockey, lacrosse, polo, rodeo, rugby, running, sky diving, swimming, water polo, and wrestling. In 2006, the polo team, composed of Will Tankard, Ross Haislip, Peter Blake, and Tanner Kneese, won the collegiate national championship.

The football program has been competing since October 3, 1925. The Red Raiders have won 15 conference titles and been to 50 bowl games, winning five of the last seven.

The men's basketball program, started in 1925,  has been to the NCAA Tournament 18 times—advancing to the Sweet 16 seven times, and the Elite Eight twice, and in 2019 they reached the Final Four and were the NCAA Tournament Runner-Up under coach Chris Beard. Bob Knight, hall-of-famer and second-winningest coach in men's college basketball history, coached the team from 2001 to 2008.

Of the varsity sports, Texas Tech has had its greatest success in women's basketball. Led by Sheryl Swoopes and head coach Marsha Sharp, the Lady Raiders won the NCAA Women's Basketball Championship in 1993. The Lady Raiders have also been to the NCAA Elite Eight three times and the NCAA Sweet 16 seven times. In early 2006, Lady Raiders coach Marsha Sharp resigned and was replaced on March 30, 2006, by Kristy Curry, who had been coaching at Purdue.

In addition, Lubbock is the home of the Chaparrals of Lubbock Christian University. With a recent move up to NCAA Division 2, the women's basketball team has won the 2016 and 2019 national championships. In 2009, the Lubbock Christian University baseball team won their second NAIA National Championship.

High-school athletics also feature prominently in the local culture.

Semi-professional teams 
The Lubbock Renegades, a member of the af2, a developmental league of the Arena Football League, were in operation from 2006 to 2008.The team played in the former Lubbock Memorial Coliseum.

The Lubbock Cotton Kings, of the former Central Hockey League, operated from 1999 to 2007.

In 2021, National Premier Soccer League announced the formation of the Lubbock Matadors in the 2022 season.

Little League
In 2007, the Lubbock Western All-Stars Little League Baseball team made it to the final four of the Little League World Series.

Parks and recreation

In March 1877, during the Buffalo Hunters' War, the Battle of Yellow House Canyon took place at what is now the site of Mackenzie Park. Today, Mackenzie Park is home to Joyland Amusement Park, Prairie Dog Town, and both a disc golf and a regular golf course. Two tributaries of the Brazos River wind through Mackenzie Park, which is collectively part of the rather extensive Lubbock Park system. These two streams, Yellow House Draw and Blackwater Draw, converge in the golf course, forming the head of Yellow House Canyon, which carries the waters of the North Fork Double Mountain Fork Brazos River.

Lubbock is home to numerous parks, scattered throughout the city. Most parks feature a small lake and attract waterfowl of various species. One of Lubbock's larger lakes, Dunbar Historic Lake, lies in Dunbar Historic Lake Park, near Mackenzie Park. Drainage exits into the North Fork Double Mountain Fork Brazos River. The park features miles of hiking trails and the Crosbyton-Southplains Railroad trestle, built in 1911, which spans the North Fork Double Mountain Fork Brazos River at the park's southeast end. This trestle has become known by many locals as "Hell's Gate" or "Hell's Gate Trestle" for its supposed paranormal activity.

Many parks in Lubbock are home to a series of Playa Lakes. Often small in size, the lakes serve as reservoirs for stormwater and irrigation runoff, and are an important part of the West Texas High Plains ecosystem. Playa lakes generally drain from one to another over land during a rainfall event, but many were connected as part of an underground drainage project in the early 2000's to avoid flooding.

Government

Municipal government

Lubbock has a council-manager government system, with all governmental powers resting in a legislative body called a city council. Voters elect six council members, one for each of Lubbock's six districts, and a mayor. The council members serve for a term of four years, and the mayor serves for two years. After the first meeting of the city council after newly elected council members are seated, the council elects a mayor pro tempore, who serves as mayor in absence of the elected mayor. The council also appoints a city manager to handle the ordinary business of the city. Currently, no term limits are set for either city council members or the mayor.

After a previous attempt failed in the city council, Lubbock approved by popular referendum a "sanctuary city for the unborn" ordinance, seeking to outlaw abortion within city limits. The ordinance went into effect shortly thereafter and the only abortion clinic stopped performing abortions. Planned Parenthood sued and a federal judge upheld the ordinance.

The Lubbock Police Department was shaped by the long-term administration of Chief J. T. Alley (1923–2009), who served from 1957 to 1983, the third-longest tenure in state history. Under Chief Alley, the department formed its first Juvenile Division, K-9 Corps, Rape Crisis Center, and Special Weapons and Tactics teams. He also presided over the desegregation of the department and coordinated efforts during the 1970 tornadoes. As of 2018, the department had 443 officers with a total of 500 being the ultimate target according to then Police Chief Greg Stevens.

Education

K-12 Schools

Schools in Lubbock are operated by several public school districts and independent organizations.

Public school districts with sections serving the Lubbock city limits:
Lubbock Independent School District
Frenship Independent School District
Idalou Independent School District
Lubbock-Cooper Independent School District
New Deal Independent School District
Roosevelt Independent School District
Shallowater Independent School District

Private schools:
All Saints Episcopal School
Christ the King Cathedral School
Trinity Christian School
Lubbock Christian School
Kingdom Preparatory Academy
Southcrest Christian School

Charter schools:

 Harmony Science Academy
 Sharp Academy

Higher education

Lubbock is home to Texas Tech University, which was established on February 10, 1923, as Texas Technological College. It is the leading institution of the Texas Tech University System and has the seventh-largest enrollment in the state of Texas. It is one of two schools (the other being UT Austin) in Texas to house an undergraduate institution, law school, and medical school at the same location. Altogether, the university has educated students from all 50 US states and over 100 foreign countries. Enrollment has continued to increase in recent years, and growth is on track with a plan to have 40,000 students by 2020.

Lubbock is also home to other college campuses in the city, including Lubbock Christian University, South Plains College, Wayland Baptist University, and Sunset International Bible Institute.

Covenant Health System, a health-care provider serving West Texas and Eastern New Mexico, operates a school of nursing, school of radiography, and school of surgical technology.

Media

Lubbock's main newspaper is the daily Lubbock Avalanche-Journal, which is owned by Gannett. The newspaper also publishes a full-color lifestyle magazine, Lubbock Magazine, eight times a year. Texas Tech University publishes a student-run daily newspaper called The Daily Toreador.

Local TV stations include KTTZ-TV-5 (PBS), KCBD-11 (NBC), KLBK-13 (CBS), KAMC-28 (ABC), and KJTV-TV-34 (Fox).

Texas Tech University Press, the book- and journal-publishing office of Texas Tech University, was founded in 1971, and as of 2012, has about 400 scholarly, regional, literary, and children's titles in print.

Radio
88.1 KTXT-FM (College)
88.5 K203CB (Christian Contemporary)
89.1 KTTZ-FM (Public Radio)
89.7 KLTB (Spanish Christian)
90.1 KAMY-FM (Christian Contemporary)
90.5 KBAH (Religious)
90.9 KKLU (Christian Contemporary)
91.5 K218DI (Religious)
91.9 KPGA (FM)(Christian Contemporary)
92.3 K222CQ KLZK (Hip Hop)
92.7 KVCE (Religious)
93.1 K226CH KTTU-FM (Texas Country)
93.7 KLBB-FM (Classic Hits)
94.1 K231BE KLZK (Classic Country)
94.5 KFMX (Active Rock)
95.1 K236CP KFYO (AM) (News & Talk)
95.5 KAIQ (Regional Mexican)
95.9 K240FA KRFE (Talk)
96.3 KLLL (Country)
96.9 K245BG KTTU-FM (Classic Country)
97.3 KTTU-FM (Sports)
97.7 K249DU KTTU-FM (Oldies)
98.1 KKCL-FM (Classic Hits)
98.7 K254CI ( Christian Contemporary)
99.1 KLCT LPFM (Religious)
99.5 KQBR (Country)
100.3 KMMX (Top-40)
100.7 K264AN (Sports Talk)
101.1 KONE-FM (Classic Rock)
101.7 K269HH KKLU (Christian Contemporary)
102.1 K271DE KAMY-FM (Christian Contemporary)
102.5 KZII (Top-40)
102.9 KVIO-FM LPFM (Religious)
103.5 KAMZ (Regional Mexican)
103.9 K280GU KKAM (Talk)
104.3 KHLK (Religious)
104.9 KBTE (Hip Hop)
105.3 KJDL-FM (Spanish Christian)
105.7 KRBL (Texas Country)
106.5 KXTQ-FM (Tejano)
106.9 KKYN (Country)
107.3 KSSL (Classic Country)
107.7 KLZK (Hot Adult Contemporary)

Infrastructure
The Texas Department of Criminal Justice operates the Lubbock District Parole Office in Lubbock.

The Texas Department of Transportation operates the West Regional Support Center and Lubbock District Office in Lubbock.

The United States Postal Service operates post offices in Lubbock.

Transportation

Highways

Lubbock is served by major highways. Interstate 27 (the former Avenue H) links the city to Amarillo and Interstate 40, a transcontinental route. I-27 was completed through the city in 1992 (it originally terminated just north of downtown). Other major highways include US 62 and US 82, which run concurrently (except for 4th Street (82) and 19th Street (62)) through the city east–west as the Marsha Sharp Freeway, 19th Street (62 only), 4th Street/Parkway Drive (82 only) and Idalou Highway. US 84 (Avenue Q/Slaton Highway/Clovis Road) is also another east–west route running NW/SE diagonally. US Highway 87 runs between San Angelo and Amarillo and follows I-27 concurrently. State Highway 114 runs east–west, following US 62/82 on the east before going its own way. Lubbock is circled by Loop 289, which suffers from traffic congestion despite being a potential bypass around the city, which is the reason behind I-27 and Brownfield Highway being built through the city to have freeway traffic flow effectively inside the loop.

The city is set up on a simple grid plan. In the heart of the city, numbered streets run east–west and lettered avenues run north–south – the grid begins at Avenue A in the east and First Street in the north. North of First Street, city planners chose to name streets alphabetically from the south to the north after colleges and universities. The north–south avenues run from A to Y. What would be Avenue Z is actually University Avenue, since it runs along the east side of Texas Tech. Beyond that, the A-to-Z convention resumes, using US cities found east of the Mississippi (e.g. Akron Avenue, Boston Avenue, Canton Avenue). Again, the Z name is not used, with Slide Road appearing in its place.

Rail service
Lubbock currently does not provide intercity rail service, although various proposals have been presented over the years to remedy this. One, the Caprock Chief, would have seen daily service as part of a Fort Worth, Texas—Denver, Colorado service, but it failed to gain interest. Lubbock is served by the BNSF Railway company, Plainsman Switching Company (PSC), and West Texas & Lubbock Railway (WTLC). PSC interchanges with BNSF (also with UP through a UP-BNSF Haulage agreement) in Lubbock and has 19 miles of track within city limits of Lubbock with 36 customers. Options exist for transloading a variety of materials on the line, from wind-turbine parts to steel shafts. PSC handles many commodities such as cottonseed, cottonseed oil, cottonseed meal, cottonseed hulls, milo, corn, wheat, pinto beans, sand, rock, lumber, nonperishable food items, chemicals, paper products, brick, and bagging material, and can also store cars. WTLC interchanges with BNSF (also with UP through a UP-BNSF Haulage agreement) in Lubbock. WTLC has a yard on the west side of Lubbock, where they switch cars to go down their line to Levelland or to Brownfield. WTLC handles commodities of grains, chemicals, sands, peanuts, lumber, etc.

Airports

The city's air services are provided by Lubbock Preston Smith International Airport, which is named for the Lubbock businessman who became lieutenant governor and governor of Texas. It is on the city's northeast side. The airport is the eighth-busiest airport in Texas. Lubbock Preston Smith Airport also plays host as a major hub to FedEx's feeder planes that serve cities around Lubbock.

Intercity bus service
Greyhound Lines operates the Lubbock Station at 801 Broadway, just east of the Lubbock County Courthouse.

Public transportation

Public transportation is provided by Citibus, a bus transit system running Monday through Saturday every week with a transit center hub in downtown. It runs bus routes throughout the city, with the main routes converging at the Downtown Transfer Plaza, which also houses the Greyhound bus terminal. Citibus has been in continual service since 1971, when the city of Lubbock took over public transit operations. The paratransit system is called Citiaccess.

Citibus' six diesel-electric hybrid buses have begun service on city routes. Managers hope the buses will use 60% of the fuel their older, larger versions consume in moving customers across the city. The buses seat 23 passengers, can support full-sized wheelchairs, and will run on all but two city-based routes.

Modal characteristics
According to the 2016 American Community Survey, 80.9% of working Lubbock (city) residents commuted by driving alone, 12.9% carpooled, 1% used public transportation, and 1.5% walked. About 1.5% used all other forms of transportation, including taxi, bicycle, and motorcycle. About 2.3% worked at home.

In 2015, 7.3% of Lubbock households were without a car, which decreased to 5.6% in 2016. The national average was 8.7% in 2016. Lubbock averaged 1.74 cars per household in 2016, compared to a national average of 1.8 per household.

Milwaukee Avenue
In the early years of the 21st century, Lubbock turned its Milwaukee Avenue into a major thoroughfare. Previously, Milwaukee was a 4-mile dirt road on farm land with hardly any traffic a mile or more from major development. With growth headed westward, the city allocated nearly $20 million to convert the road into a seven-lane concrete thoroughfare. In 2004, the city funded the project and other developments to come by establishing a new fund that tapped part of the franchise fees received. As of 2018, more than $124 million in street construction has been possible from the fund, including Slide Road, 98th Street, Indiana Avenue, and the last phases of the Marsha Sharp Freeway. Public Works Director Wood Franklin said Milwaukee Avenue was conceived on the "build it and they will come" theory. Marc McDougal, then the mayor of Lubbock, described the project as a well calculated risk that subsequently greatly benefited the city.

Notable people

Arts and science

 Chace Crawford, actor, notable for roles in The Covenant, Gossip Girl and The Boys
 Dan Flores, a writer and historian who specializes in cultural and environmental studies of the American West who began his academic career at Texas Tech University
 Bryan A. Garner, Lawyer, lexicographer, and teacher. J. Michael Bailey, psychologist and professor at Northwestern University, was born in Lubbock
 Jill Goodacre, model and actress
 Rick Husband, Astronaut and graduate from Texas Tech University
 Joshua Meyer, artist
 Gabor B. Racz, professor of anesthesiology at Texas Tech University Health Science Center, is the inventor of the Racz catheter
 Wayne Tippit (1932-2009), American television and stage character actor
 Erik Valdez, actor
 Helen Wagner (1918-2010), television actress (As the World Turns)
 Spencer Wells, a geneticist, grew up in Lubbock and graduated from Lubbock High School
 Kevin Williamson, National Review roving correspondent, grew up in Lubbock and once worked for the Lubbock Avalanche-Journal
 Micah Wright, author

Military

 Taylor Force late United States Army officer after whom the Taylor Force Act was named

Music

 Josh Abbott, singer of Texas country band Josh Abbott Band
 Terry Allen, Texas country and outlaw country singer-songwriter, painter and conceptual artist
 Ponty Bone, singer, accordion player
 Wade Bowen, Texas Country/Red Dirt singer
 Mac Davis, country music singer, songwriter, and actor
 Travis Garland of the band NLT
 Jimmie Dale Gilmore, Butch Hancock, and Joe Ely (collectively known as The Flatlanders)
 Pat Green, Texas country music artist
 Buddy Holly, musician and singer-songwriter who was a central and pioneering figure of mid-1950s rock and roll
 Bobby Keys, saxophonist
 Logan Lynn, singer, musician, writer, composer, singer, producer
 Lloyd Maines of The Maines Brothers Band
 Natalie Maines singer of the band The Chicks
 Delbert McClinton American blues rock and electric blues singer-songwriter, guitarist, harmonica player, and pianist
 Richie McDonald, lead singer of Lonestar until 2007
 Kevin Morby, indie folk singer-songwriter
 Cory Morrow, Texas country singer-songwriter
 Daron Norwood, American 90's country singer, signed to Giant
 Norman Carl Odam (aka The Legendary Stardust Cowboy)
 Pete Orta of the Christian rock group Petra
 Amanda Shires, singer-songwriter and fiddle player
 Josh Wilson, a contemporary Christian musician.
 Flatland Cavalry, a country and Americana band.

Politics

 William H. Bledsoe, State Senator who in 1923 pushed for the legislation and the first $1 million appropriation which brought Texas Tech University to Lubbock
 William John Cox (Billy Jack Cox), political activist
 Robert L. Duncan, an American politician and the fourth chancellor of the Texas Tech University System
 John Frullo, is a Republican politician who represents district 84 in the Texas House of Representatives
 Delwin Jones late American politician, who, prior to 2011, was the oldest member of the Texas House of Representatives, having represented what became, and what remains District 83 based in the area surrounding Lubbock
 Mickey Leland, late Texas U.S. Representative
 John T. Montford, former member of the Texas State Senate from District 28, based about Lubbock. He is also a former district attorney for Lubbock County and a former chancellor of the Texas Tech University Systems
 James C. Nance, co-founder of Plains Journal, Oklahoma community newspaper chain publisher and Speaker of the Oklahoma House of Representatives, President pro tempore of the Oklahoma Senate and member Uniform Law Commission
 Charles Perry, member of the Texas State Senate from West Texas District 28 which contains the two cities of Lubbock and San Angelo
 Preston Earnest Smith, a long-time resident of Lubbock, was the 40th Governor of Texas from 1969 to 1973 and earlier served as the lieutenant governor from 1963 to 1969
 Frank E. Wheelock, Lubbock's founding mayor who held the office from 1909 to 1915

Sports

 Ruben Castillo, boxer
 Madisyn Cox, competitive swimmer
 Mason Crosby, American football placekicker for the Green Bay Packers of the National Football League (NFL)
 Jarrett Culver, shooting guard for the Memphis Grizzlies
 Craig Ehlo, basketball player
 Anthony Lynn, American football head coach of the Los Angeles Chargers who coached at Texas Tech University
 Greg Minton, former Major League Baseball pitcher
 Donnie Moore, baseball player
 Terry Norris, boxer
 Orlin Norris, boxer
 Mark Payne is an American professional basketball player who plays for Champagne Châlons Reims Basket of the LNB Pro A
 Ron Reeves, former American football quarterback
 Micheal Ray Richardson, basketball player and coach
 Daniel Santiago, former professional basketball player
 W. E. Shattuc, who raced in the Indianapolis 500 in 1925, 1926, and 1927
 Ryan Tannehill, quarterback for the Miami Dolphins and later, the Tennessee Titans
 Don Wayne (Bubba Shobert), National Motorcycle Champion
 Trae Young, point guard for the Atlanta Hawks
 Shea Salinas, soccer player for the San Jose Earthquakes

Sister cities

Current sister cities
 City of Musashino, Tokyo, Japan – relationship established 1983

Former sister cities
 City of León, Guanajuato, Mexico – relationship established 1985

Proposed sister cities
 City of Can Tho, Vietnam
 City of Ulsan, South Korea
 Ciudad Acuña, Mexico

See also

Rosenthal Field

Notes

References

Further reading

  An illustrated history of Lubbock
 
  The world's largest expanse of flat land, in words and images
 
  Anecdotes from the region
  The History of the Lubbock Art Association and of art activities in Lubbock and surrounding counties

External links

Visit Lubbock

 
Cities in Texas
Cities in Lubbock County, Texas
Populated places established in 1876
County seats in Texas
1876 establishments in Texas